Martin Eisl (born 14 November 1982) is an Austrian professional footballer  currently playing for Austrian side SVA Kindberg. He plays as a goalkeeper.

References

External links
 

1982 births
Living people
Austrian footballers
Association football goalkeepers
FC Red Bull Salzburg players
Kapfenberger SV players
SV Grödig players